Wymysłów may refer to the following places:
Wymysłów, Kutno County in Łódź Voivodeship (central Poland)
Wymysłów, Gmina Kobiele Wielkie in Łódź Voivodeship (central Poland)
Wymysłów, Kraśnik County in Lublin Voivodeship (east Poland)
Wymysłów, Gmina Przedbórz in Łódź Voivodeship (central Poland)
Wymysłów, Gmina Żytno in Łódź Voivodeship (central Poland)
Wymysłów, Skierniewice County in Łódź Voivodeship (central Poland)
Wymysłów, Zduńska Wola County in Łódź Voivodeship (central Poland)
Wymysłów, Opole Lubelskie County in Lublin Voivodeship (east Poland)
Wymysłów, Gmina Miechów in Lesser Poland Voivodeship (south Poland)
Wymysłów, Gmina Słaboszów in Lesser Poland Voivodeship (south Poland)
Wymysłów, Olkusz County in Lesser Poland Voivodeship (south Poland)
Wymysłów, Kazimierza County in Świętokrzyskie Voivodeship (south-central Poland)
Wymysłów, Ostrowiec County in Świętokrzyskie Voivodeship (south-central Poland)
Wymysłów, Gmina Działoszyce in Świętokrzyskie Voivodeship (south-central Poland)
Wymysłów, Gmina Kije in Świętokrzyskie Voivodeship (south-central Poland)
Wymysłów, Gmina Złota in Świętokrzyskie Voivodeship (south-central Poland)
Wymysłów, Gmina Połaniec in Świętokrzyskie Voivodeship (south-central Poland)
Wymysłów, Gmina Szydłów in Świętokrzyskie Voivodeship (south-central Poland)
Wymysłów, Włoszczowa County in Świętokrzyskie Voivodeship (south-central Poland)
Wymysłów, Kozienice County in Masovian Voivodeship (east-central Poland)
Wymysłów, Gmina Borkowice in Masovian Voivodeship (east-central Poland)
Wymysłów, Gmina Potworów in Masovian Voivodeship (east-central Poland)
Wymysłów, Gmina Skaryszew in Masovian Voivodeship (east-central Poland)
Wymysłów, Gmina Wolanów in Masovian Voivodeship (east-central Poland)
Wymysłów, Sochaczew County in Masovian Voivodeship (east-central Poland)
Wymysłów, Żyrardów County in Masovian Voivodeship (east-central Poland)
Wymysłów, Słupca County in Greater Poland Voivodeship (west-central Poland)
Wymysłów, Turek County in Greater Poland Voivodeship (west-central Poland)
Wymysłów, Silesian Voivodeship (south Poland)